Christmas Next Door is a 2017 American made-for-television Hallmark Channel family romance film directed by Jonathan Wright  and starring Fiona Gubelmann and Jesse Metcalfe. It premiered on 16 December 2017 on Hallmark Channel as part of Countdown to Christmas — annual holiday programming event. It attracted more than 4.4 million viewers, ranking 8th in top 10 cable programs.

Plot
Eric Redford (Jesse Metcalfe) is a popular writer and bachelor, writing books on living single. When he is left in charge of his niece and nephew for the Christmas season, he turns to neighbour April Stewart (Fiona Gubelmann), who loves the holiday season, for help. As the result, he slowly starts to reassess his attitude to Christmas, life and love.

Cast
Jesse Metcalfe as Eric Redford 
Fiona Gubelmann as April Stewart
Jacob Blair as Steve
Brittany Bristow as Elaine
Jenna Weir as Chelsea
Joy Tanner as Dana 
Andrew Jackson as Bruce
Eugene Clark as Nick 
Tara Yelland as Bridget
Mary Long as Sarah Redford
Christian Potenza as Ryan
Kevin Claydon as Jack
Evan Cleaver as Ted
Liam MacDonald as Liam

References

External links
 

2017 television films
2017 films
2010s romance films
American romance films
American Christmas films
Christmas television films
Hallmark Channel original films
Films directed by Jonathan Wright (director)
2010s English-language films
2010s American films